= Sukhpar =

- Census Town
- Location in Gujarat, India
- Coordinates: 23.215712°N 69.607573°E
- Country: India
- State: Gujarat
- District: Kachchh

Languages
  - Official: Gujarati
- Time zone: UTC+5:30 (IST)

Sukhpar is a Census town situated in Kachchh district of Gujarat, India.

== Demographics ==
Sukhpar consist of total population of 13,303 people. The town has a literacy rate of 81.72 percent, higher than the Gujarat state's average literacy rate of 78.03 percent.
